Tarian may refer to:
 Tărian, a village in Girișu de Criș Commune, Bihor County, Romania
 Faryab, Dashtestan, Iran